Pat Power (29 March 1942 – 3 December 2009) was an Australian politician.

He was born in Cobden. In 1992 he was elected to the Victorian Legislative Council as a Labor member for Jika Jika. He was Shadow Minister for Regional Development (1992–93), Local Government and Regional Development (1993–97), Roads and Ports (1996–99), and Local Government (1997–99), and deputy leader of the Opposition in the upper house from February to September 1999, when he lost preselection to recontest his seat. He died in 2009.

References

1942 births
2009 deaths
Members of the Victorian Legislative Council
Australian Labor Party members of the Parliament of Victoria
20th-century Australian politicians